Tarbiat Modares University (:  Dāneshgāh-e Tarbiyat Modares, lit. "Professor Training University") is a graduate university with its main campus in Tehran, Iran. It was founded in 1982 to train university professors and is among the top universities in Iran. Admission is through national-level university exams (i.e., Concours), and in most programs, is limited to top performers.

About TMU
Established in 1982, Tarbiat Modares University (TMU) is the first comprehensive graduate school in Iran. In particular, the majority of Ph.D. programs in basic sciences and engineering were initially offered at TMU. As an elite exclusively postgraduate university, its primary mission is to train academic staff and researchers for universities and higher education centers, as well as provide an environment for world-class research. TMU currently offers M.A/M.Sc. degrees in 171 academic programs and Ph.D. degrees in 132 academic programs, with more than 8000 students and 775 academic staff.

Faculty of Agriculture
The College of Agriculture was established  in 1983. The primary objective was to train and educate graduate students at M.Sc. and Ph.D. levels for work as professionals in universities and research institutes as well as in the private sectors. A wide range of science courses is offered for postgraduate students. Specialized seminars help students focus their research in areas related to their interests as well as solving agricultural challenges at the national and global scale.

Faculty of Art and Architecture

The faculty offers courses in various areas such as painting, animation, specific art studies, theatre, graphics, visual art literature, architecture, urban and regional planning, construction, and building management.  Facilities include studios, computer center, and library. Many directors, professors, and lecturers in other universities and organizations are graduates of this college.

Faculty of Basic Sciences

The Faculty of Basic Sciences (FBS) was originally composed of the Departments of Biology, Chemistry, Geology, Mathematics, and Physics. Rapid growth in student numbers and an agglomeration of research facilities led to the Departments of Biology, Mathematics, and Top Technologies forming their own corresponding Colleges. At this time FBS encompasses the Departments of Chemistry, Geology, and Physics.

The Chemistry Department is active in four areas: Analytical, Inorganic, Organic, and Physical Chemistry. 
The Geology Department is active in four areas: Economics, Geology, Engineering Geology, Petrology, and Tectonics. 
The Physics Department is active in three areas: Atomic and Molecular Physics, Condense phase, and Particle Physics.

Faculty of Biological Sciences

Life sciences began with three members of the faculty in plant sciences and genetics groups in 1366. Department of Biochemistry and Biophysics were added in the following year and the Department of Biology was formed into four groups consisting of plant sciences, genetics, biochemistry, and biophysics, with the Nanobiotechnology field added ten years later. The Department of Biology was also added to the Faculty of Biological Sciences.

Faculty of Chemical Engineering

The Faculty of Chemical Engineering was established in 1983. The Faculty has six departments including Chemical Engineering-Process, Petroleum Engineering, Polymer Engineering, Polymerization Processes Engineering, Biotechnology Engineering, and Biomedical Engineering. The faculty is known as the applied scientific hub for biotechnology and hydrocarbon processes across the country.

Faculty of Civil & Environmental Engineering
The Faculty of Civil & Environmental Engineering offers a variety of M.Sc. and Ph.D. degree programs.

Faculty of Electrical and Computer Engineering

The Faculty of Electrical and Computer Engineering (ECE)  provides for specialization in MSc and Ph.D. levels in biomedical engineering, computer engineering, communications, control, electronics, power electronics, power systems and IT Engineering (E-commerce and ICT).

The ECE Faculty has strong research ties with the industry and has significantly increased its collaborations and joint planning activities in recent years. This Faculty has obtained several strategic grants for developing research laboratories in Optoelectronics, VLSI, satellite communications, power electronics converters, and power systems.

Faculty of Humanities

The Faculty of Humanities was established in 1982. The Faculty holds two language laboratories, a library with a large number of rare books, a computer center, and laboratories for geography, psychology, and physical education.

Faculty of Industrial and Systems Engineering
The Faculty of Industrial and Systems Engineering has five departments including Electronic Marketing and Business, Industrial Engineering, IT Engineering, Socio-economic Systems Engineering, and Systems and Productivity Management.

Faculty of Law

The Faculty of Law was established in 2012 and always focused its attention on promoting education and research, especially at the doctoral level. To accomplish this mission, feasibility studies are carried out to assess the legal principles used in judicial proceedings for research projects.

Faculty of Management and Economics
The Establishment of the Faculty of Management and Economics commenced in 2009.

Faculty of Mathematical Sciences

The Faculty of Mathematical sciences has four departments: Applied Math., Pure Math., Statistics, and Computer Sciences. Department of Applied Mathematics is active in Mathematical Modeling, Numerical Analysis, and Optimization. The research areas in the Department of Pure Mathematics include Algebra (Group Theory and Non-Commutative Algebra), Analysis (Harmonic and Functional Analysis), Dynamical systems, Topology-Geometry (Algebraic and Differential), and Logic. Department of Statistics is actively involved in Spatial and Environmental Statistics, Statistical Shape Analysis, Multilevel Data Analysis, Bayesian Inference, and Official Statistics. Departments of Pure Math., Applied Math, and Statistics offer admission to students in M.Sc. and Ph.D. programs.

The Department of Computer Sciences is active in image processing, machine learning, data mining, and computational aspects of artificial intelligence

Faculty of Mechanical Engineering
Mechanical engineering is regarded as a leading founding member of the faculty.
It now embraces a wide range of scientific disciplines organized in four different groups including: manufacturing engineering, applied design, energy conversion, and aerospace engineering.
The department is mostly research oriented though the curriculum is implemented by both course and research.

website: https://www.modares.ac.ir/en-meche

Faculty of Medical Sciences

The Faculty of Medical Sciences was established in 1982. Doctorate postgraduate courses started in 1988 by admitting 26 Ph.D. students in six fields of medical sciences including Biostatistics, Parasitology, Anatomy, Bacteriology, and Biochemistry. This faculty consists of 18 departments.

Faculty of Engineering and Technology 
The Faculty of Engineering works in the areas of materials and mining engineering.

Faculty of Natural Resources and Marine Sciences

The Faculty of Natural Resources and Marine Sciences was founded in 1982 in the city of Noor beside the Caspian Sea. The faculty offers a wide range of research opportunities in nine specialized areas. The faculty includes the academic departments of Watershed Management, Forestry, Fishery, Wood and Paper Science, Environment, Range Management, Marine Biology, and Physical Oceanography.

Rankings

Notable alumni and faculty
 Mir-Hossein Mousavi, Iranian reformist politician and the leader of the "Green Movement".
 Asghar Farhadi, Iranian film maker and writer who has won two Academy Awards and one Golden Globe for his films A Separation (2011) and The Salesman (2016).
 Hashem Aghajari, Iranian historian.
 Emad Afroogh, politician and sociologist.
 Mohammad Bagher Ghalibaf, mayor of Tehran.
 Mohammad Mehdi Zahedi, former Minister of Science and Technology.
 Ata'ollah Mohajerani, former Minister of Culture and Islamic Guidance (Iran).
 Mohsen Kadivar, Iranian philosopher, university lecturer, cleric and activist.
 Mohammad Reza Hafeznia, full professor of political geography.
 Jafar Towfighi, Iranian chemical engineer, academic and politician who served as minister of science, research and technology in the cabinet headed by then president Mohammad Khatami from 2003 to 2005.
 Farhad Daneshjoo, the current president of the Azad University and the former president of TMU.
 Masoumeh Ebtekar, a scientist, journalist and politician, the first woman vice president of Iran.
 Gholamali Montazer, deputy director of Iran's National Elites Foundation.
 Behrouz Boochani, Kurdish journalist, human rights defender, poet and film producer.

Science and Technology Park 

MSTP is a comprehensive Science and Technology Park in Tehran which was launched in 2003 by the authorization of the Ministry of Science, Research and Technology. This organization possesses two campuses of 60 and 4.8 hectares in North-East (Shahid BaBaee) and West (Pajouhesh Campus) of Tehran, respectively.

In addition, central bureau and sextuple incubators (including; Technology, Fundamental Sciences, Art, Humanities, Agriculture and Natural Resources, Health and Medical Sciences) are located in downtown Tehran. Depending on the enterprises situation, the best location of establishment can be selected among these trial campuses.

See also

Higher Education in Iran
Tarbiat Modares' library management system

References 

 
1982 establishments in Iran
Educational institutions established in 1982